Shlomit Malka (born December 23, 1993) is an Israeli fashion model and television host. Earlier in her career she was credited as Shiloh Malka, but she has since been credited as her birth name.

She has appeared in major international campaigns for L'Oreal, Armani, Ralph Lauren, Maybelline, Lancome, Chanel,  Schwarzkopf, Bershka, Bebe, and Müller Yogurt.  In 2013, she broke into the ten highest earning models in Israel.

Early life and career 
Shlomit Malka was born in Rehovot, Israel, to a Jewish family. Her father is of Moroccan origin while her mother is from Ukraine. Her father Maxim Ron "Max" Malka was a restaurateur, and her mother Anna Magin is a CEO of a PR company. Her parents separated when she was four years old. She also grew up with her mother and maternal grandparents in Kiryat Ekron, Israel. Besides Hebrew, Malka also speaks English and Russian (her mother's native language).

During Malka's first year as a soldier in the Israel Defense Forces, where she served as an instructor in the Combat Engineering Corps special forces unit Yahalom, Malka was discovered by a model agent from her Facebook pictures. She managed to win permission to work during her military service and promptly won contracts with Armani, Ralph Lauren, L'Oreal and Schwarzkopf.

During her military service, the IDF permitted her to take part in modeling shoots after pre-approving her requests so long as she made up the time afterwards. She says that the "balance between the military and modelling makes me feel good. I am grounded all the time". Her personal interests are physics, mathematics, and animal welfare.

In 2013, she was chosen as one of Israel breakout models of the year.

In 2015, she became the face of Italian lingerie company Intimissimi, leading its worldwide campaign, a position previously filled by Irina Shayk, Barbara Palvin, Bar Refaeli and Ana Beatriz Barros.  Intimissimi was drawn to her natural beauty.

Personal life 
In May 2017, she married Israeli actor and model Yehuda Levi. They resided in Tel Aviv. The couple announced that they separated in June 2021.
 
On 13 August 2017, Malka had a scooter accident. Passers-by said they found her lying on the ground, unconscious and having suffered a head injury. She was transported to Ichilov Hospital, where she was placed in a medically-induced coma.  She had been in critical condition, unable to breathe on her own.  A paramedic had called her condition 'unstable.'" She has since fully recovered.

References

External links

Showreel

Model directories 
Shiloh Malka on Fashion Model Directory
Shlomit Malka at Models.com
Shlomit Malka at Uno Models
Shiloh Malka at Women Direct, Milan

Israeli female models
Israeli people of Ukrainian-Jewish descent
Jewish female models
People from Rehovot
1993 births
Living people
Israeli female military personnel
The Lions (agency) models